"Riptide" is a song by American electronic production duo the Chainsmokers, released via Disruptor Records and Columbia Records on April 22, 2022, as the third single from the duo's fourth studio album So Far So Good (2022). The song was co-written with Coldplay frontman Chris Martin and frequent collaborator Emily Warren. The song contains auto-tuned vocals by Drew Taggart.

Charts

References

2022 singles
2022 songs
The Chainsmokers songs
Columbia Records singles
Disruptor Records singles
Song recordings produced by the Chainsmokers
Songs written by Alex Pall
Songs written by Andrew Taggart
Songs written by Chris Martin
Songs written by Emily Warren